Lajos Szakacsi was born in Budapest and worked in the film industry from 1975 to 2012. He oversaw the production of the award winning movie Fateless before his retirement. He is the father of the American music producer and guitarist Gabor Szakacsi.

Filmography
The man from London
Fateless
Dolina

References

External links 
https://nava.hu/id/374292/# (Lajos Szakacsi-National Audiovisual Archive)
https://www.imdb.com/name/nm1737341/
http://mandarchiv.hu/tart/jatekfilm?name=jatekfilm&action=person&id=270031987
http://www.bfi.org.uk/films-tv-people/4ce2bd7b51877

1946 births
Living people
Hungarian film producers